The 2005–06 Wisconsin Badgers men's basketball team represented University of Wisconsin–Madison. The head coach was Bo Ryan, coaching his fifth season with the Badgers. The team played its home games at the Kohl Center in Madison, Wisconsin as a member of the Big Ten Conference.

Season Notes
This Wisconsin team was off to a very promising and exciting start to the season, beginning 14–2, and 4–0 in Big-Ten play. The Badgers rose to #15 in the AP Poll and #13 in the Coaches Poll. Then they went 5–8 over their final 13 regular season games before bowing out in the first round of the Big Ten tournament and NCAA tournament to finish with a record of 19–12.

The beginning of the end came in the 17th game of the season with a loss at Ohio State on January 18, 2006. This marked the first game Wisconsin played without freshman Marcus Landry and sophomore Greg Stiemsma, who were each ruled academically ineligible for the second semester. Then the next game, Wisconsin had their 27-game home non-conference winning streak snapped in a shocking upset, as North Dakota State won, 62–55, at the Kohl Center.

It was an unfortunate blow as both Landry and Stiemsma had become key contributors. Juniors Alando Tucker and Kammron Taylor led the team in scoring, with 19.0 ppg and 14.2 ppg, respectively. Brian Butch stepped up as a sophomore to average 9.9 ppg.

Awards
All-Big Ten by Media
 Alando Tucker - 1st team
 Kammron Taylor - Honorable mention

All-Big Ten by Coaches
 Alando Tucker - 1st team
 Kammron Taylor - Honorable mention
 Joe Krabbenhoft - All-Freshman team

Roster

Schedule

|-
!colspan=12| Regular Season

|-
!colspan=12| Big Ten tournament

|-
!colspan=12| NCAA tournament

References

Wisconsin Badgers men's basketball seasons
Wisconsin
Wisconsin
Wisconsin Badgers men's b
Wisconsin Badgers men's b